Nathan Graham (born 23 November 1971) is a professional rugby league coach who is the head coach of Scotland and a former rugby league footballer who played as a  or  in the 1990s and 2000s. 

He played at international level for Scotland, and at club level for the Dewsbury Rams (two spells), Bradford Bulls, Featherstone Rovers (Heritage No. 818), York City Knights and the Batley Bulldogs.

Playing career

Bradford Bulls
He made 26 appearances for York City Knights in 2004.

Featherstone Rovers
Nathan Graham made his début for Featherstone Rovers on 2 December 2001.

International
Graham was a Scotland international and played at the 2000 Rugby League World Cup.

Coaching career
After his playing career ended Graham moved into coaching and in October 2016 joined Keighley Cougars as assistant coach after five years of amateur team Drighlington ARLFC.

Graham was appointed head coach of Scotland at the end of 2019.

References

External links
The Teams: Scotland
Scotland profile

1971 births
Living people
Place of birth missing (living people)
Batley Bulldogs players
Bradford Bulls players
Dewsbury Rams players
Featherstone Rovers players
Rugby league centres
Rugby league fullbacks
Rugby league hookers
Rugby league locks
Rugby league wingers
Scotland national rugby league team captains
Scotland national rugby league team coaches
Scotland national rugby league team players
York City Knights players